Thomas Edward Hannon (born March 5, 1955) is a former American football player. He played professionally as a safety for nine seasons in the National Football League (NFL) with the Minnesota Vikings. He was a starter in 103 of the 117 games he played for the Vikings, including every non-strike game in his last six NFL seasons. Hannon had 15 interceptions in his NFL career. An interception was perhaps the top highlight of his career; he ran a first quarter interception back 41 yards for his only NFL touchdown in a 34–14 Vikings victory over the Chicago Bears in 1980. Prior to playing in the pros, he was a four-year letterman at Michigan State.

References

External links
 

1955 births
Living people
American football safeties
Michigan State Spartans football players
Minnesota Vikings players
Sportspeople from Massillon, Ohio
Players of American football from Ohio